Westernohe is an Ortsgemeinde – a community belonging to a Verbandsgemeinde – in the Westerwaldkreis in Rhineland-Palatinate, Germany.

Geography

The community lies in the Westerwald between Siegen (34 km to the north), Wetzlar (28 km to the east) and Limburg (24 km to the south). Westernohe belongs to the Verbandsgemeinde of Rennerod, a kind of collective municipality. Its seat is in the like-named town. In Westernohe itself is a big campground of the Deutsche Pfadfinderschaft Sankt Georg (DPSG).

History
In 1059, Westernohe had its first documentary mention as Westernaha.

Tug of war incident
In 1995, 650 young scouts participated in a tug of war competition. When the rope broke, only 30 seconds into the tug, two children were killed and 102 participants suffered injuries. The rope was judged to be unsuited for the use in the related court case.

Politics

The municipal council is made up of 12 council members who were elected in a majority vote in a municipal election on 13 June 2004.

Economy and infrastructure

Bundesstraße 54, linking Limburg an der Lahn with Siegen, runs 3 km west of the community. The nearest Autobahn interchange is Herborn on the A 45 (Dortmund–Aschaffenburg), some 22 km away. The nearest InterCityExpress stop is the railway station at Montabaur on the Cologne-Frankfurt high-speed rail line.

References

External links
Westernohe 
Westernohe in the collective municipality’s Web pages 

Municipalities in Rhineland-Palatinate
Westerwaldkreis